Dactyloceras widenmanni is a moth in the family Brahmaeidae. It was described by Ferdinand Karsch in 1895. It is found in the Democratic Republic of the Congo, Ethiopia, South Africa and Tanzania.

References

Brahmaeidae
Moths described in 1895